Language for a New Century: Contemporary Poetry from the Middle East, Asia, and Beyond is an anthology of works by South Asian, East Asian, Middle Eastern, and Central Asian poets edited by Tina Chang, Nathalie Handal and Ravi Shankar, published in 2008 by W. W. Norton & Company.

From the foreword, Carolyn Forché wrote, "Where else would we find poetry from a two-thousand-year-old Seal script, poetry written in the graphemic style of Sanskrit, as well as English versions of experimental poetry from the Marathi language." The poet Yusef Komunyakaa called the anthology "marvelous," and historian Howard Zinn noted that "this rich collection of poetry...fills a huge gap in our cultural heritage."

Contributors 
In order of table of contents:

References 

2008 poetry books
2008 anthologies
Poetry anthologies
 
W. W. Norton & Company books